Timothy John Gane (born 12 July 1964) is an English songwriter and guitarist who co-founded Stereolab with his then-partner Lætitia Sadier.

Biography
Gane was born in Ilford, Essex, and began his musical career  experimenting with harsh noise in the early 1980s, under the alias Unkommunitim, releasing self-financed cassettes on Black Dwarf Wreckordings along with fellow Unkommuniti members Kallous Boys and other noise projects.

He was a key member of McCarthy from 1985 until their breakup in 1990.

Stereolab
Gane later formed Stereolab with Lætitia Sadier. For the first incarnation of the band, they enlisted ex-Chills bassist Martin Kean, drummer Joe Dilworth and Gina Morris on backing vocals. In 1993, the band were signed to the American major-label Elektra and were released from their recording contract in 2004. In 2009, Stereolab announced their hiatus. Stereolab reunited for a tour in 2019 to support a series of vinyl reissues.

Turn On, Gane's side project with Sean O'Hagan, who Gane worked with in Stereolab, released their self-titled debut in 1997.

Cavern of Anti-Matter
In 2013, he released Blood-Drums under the moniker "Cavern of Anti-Matter", a band formed together with Holger Zapf and Dilworth. It was followed by the 2016 album Void Beats / Invocation Trex on Duophonic Records. It featured contributions by Bradford Cox and Peter Kember and Jan St. Werner. Live the band was reduced to a duo. In January 2017, Blood Drums was re-released through Duophonic.

In 2014, Gane compiled the tracks for Sky Records Kollektion 1, a collection of tracks from the German electronic-rock label, issued by Bureau B. In 2016, he presented FACT mix 544 for Fact Magazine.

Cavern of Anti-Matter provided the original soundtrack for the 2018 British horror comedy film In Fabric.

Personal life
Gane and Lætitia Sadier were romantically involved throughout Stereolab's early years but separated in 2002. He lives in Berlin.

References

External links
 

English rock guitarists
English rock keyboardists
1964 births
People from Barking, London
Living people
Stereolab members